Lundenes Church is a parish church of the Church of Norway in Harstad Municipality in Troms og Finnmark county, Norway. It is located in the village of Lundenes on the island of Grytøya. It is one of the churches for the Vågsfjord parish which is part of the Trondenes prosti (deanery) in the Diocese of Nord-Hålogaland. The red, wooden church was built in a long church style in 1974 using plans drawn up by the architect Osvald Flakstad. The church seats about 200 people.

See also
List of churches in Nord-Hålogaland

References

Harstad
Churches in Troms
Wooden churches in Norway
20th-century Church of Norway church buildings
Churches completed in 1974
1974 establishments in Norway
Long churches in Norway